Tillandsia mauryana is a species of flowering plant in the genus Tillandsia. This species is native to Mexico.

References

mauryana
Flora of Mexico